The Hardy Boys: Undercover Brothers is a detective fiction series of books published by Aladdin Paperbacks (an imprint of Simon & Schuster), which replaced The Hardy Boys Digest paperbacks in early 2005. All the books in the series have been written under the pen name of Franklin W. Dixon.

Series background 
The Undercover Brothers is about two teenage brother detectives, Frank and Joe Hardy, who are the sons of world-famous PI Fenton Hardy. Although there are many similarities in this series to the previous Hardy Boys series, there are also many changes, for example:

 The Hardy boys are undercover agents for American Teens Against Crime (ATAC), a top-secret government organization, co-founded by their father, and are solving more realistic and violent crimes. Since it is a top-secret organization, Frank and Joe often need to make up excuses to convince their mother and aunt to let them go to places.
 The books in this series are written in a first-person narrative style with Frank and Joe alternating chapters and often interrupting each other.
 The Hardy boys' aunt's name is shortened from Gertrude to Trudy. It is revealed in Hurricane Joe why she shortened her name to Trudy. This version is much younger than the character in other Hardy Boys series.
 The Hardy boys' long-time girlfriends, Callie Shaw  and Iola Morton, appear in the books, but only as platonic friends of the boys instead of love interests. Other friends from the original series are occasionally mentioned but never play important roles as they did in the past.
 The Hardys have a pet parrot named Playback.

Regular series

Trilogy series

Undercover Brothers Super Mysteries

The Hardy Boys Secret Files
The Hardy Boys Secret Files is a series begun in 2010 by the publisher Simon & Schuster under their Aladdin imprint. It features the Hardy Boys, Frank and Joe, as grade-school detectives. Three new titles are published yearly as paperback books and eBooks. This series ended in 2015 and was replaced by the Hardy Boys Clue Book series.

 Trouble at the Arcade
 The Missing Mitt
 Mystery Map
 Hopping Mad
 A Monster of a Mystery
 The Bicycle Thief
 The Disappearing Dog
 Sports Sabotage
 The Great Coaster Caper 
 A Rockin' Mystery (October 2012)
 Robot Rumble (April 2013)
 Lights, Camera...Zombies! (August 2013)
 Balloon Blow-Up (December 2013)
 Fossil Frenzy (April 2014)
 Ship of Secrets (August 2014)
 Camping Chaos (December 2014)
 The Great Escape (April 2015)
 Medieval Upheaval (August 2015)
 The Race Is On (December 2015)

Nancy Drew and the Hardy Boys Super Mystery
A crossover spin-off series with the Nancy Drew: Girl Detective series. The stories are told in the first person, alternating chapters between Frank's or Joe's and Nancy's perspective. The first title in the series acts as an introduction between the characters. This series published one title per year until the end of the Girl Detective and Undercover Brothers series in 2012.

Graphic novels
In the spring of 2005, NBM launched its new imprint, Papercutz, with the publication of two three-part comic book series; Nancy Drew (The Demon of River Heights) and The Hardy Boys (The Ocean of Osyria). After the completion of both series, The Demon of River Heights series and The Ocean of Osyria series were both collected into 92 pages graphic novels, becoming the first titles in the Nancy Drew graphic novel series and the Hardy Boys graphic novel series respectively.

All other titles in both series have been made in graphic novel format only and are published every three months.

List of graphic novels series titles 
2005
 1. The Ocean of Osyria
When Chet Morton's Internet account is hacked into and used to bid on a stolen artifact, the Ocean of Osyria, best friends Frank and Joe Hardy, with girlfriends Callie Shaw and Iola Morton, head to Osyria, the location of the auction, to clear Chet's name.
 2. Identity Theft
The brothers investigate a very strange mystery about a popular, wealthy teenage girl's stolen identity.
 3. Mad House
 4. Malled
The brothers and a few foreign shoppers are locked up in Bayport's new shopping mall deliberately by a mysterious man who sabotaged the mall with many traps. The 'prisoners' must struggle to survive together, find a way to escape, and find and stop the man with a few ATAC gadgets the brothers have before it is too late.

2006
 4. Malled
 5. Sea You, Sea Me
 6. Hyde and Shriek
 7. The Opposite Numbers

2007
 8. Board to Death
The brothers must figure out who is trying to kill the competition at a skateboard tournament.
 9. To Die or Not to Die
The boys head to a drama competition for high school students to snoop out a sabotager wanting to win the tournament.
 10. A Hardy Day's Night
The Hardy Boys have to rescue an agent's son or they will be dead!
 11. Abracadeath

2008
 12. Dude Ranch O' Death!
 13. The Deadliest Stunt
The brothers head to a stunt competition to work with Lindsay Rider... as backup!
 14. Haley Danelle's Top Eight!
When Haley's Internet friends start disappearing in real life, the boys decide to help out.
 15. Live Free, Die Hardy!

2009
 16. Shhhhhh!
 17. Word Up!
 18. D.A.N.G.E.R. Spells the Hangman
 19. Chaos at 50,000 feet!

2010
 20. Deadly Strategy

See also
 The Hardy Boys

References

External links 
 hardyboys.us
 Hardy Boys Undercover Brothers at Simon and Schuster
 Simon and Schuster

 
Novel series
Aladdin Paperbacks books